The hoary catshark (Apristurus canutus) is a catshark of the family Scyliorhinidae found in the western central Atlantic in the Caribbean, at depths between . The reproduction of this catshark is oviparous.

References

 
 Compagno, Dando, & Fowler, Sharks of the World, Princeton University Press, New Jersey 2005 

hoary catshark
Fish of the Caribbean
Fish of the Dominican Republic
Taxa named by Stewart Springer
Taxa named by Phillip C. Heemstra
hoary catshark